Muhammed Khuda Bukhsh (18 July 1913 – 24 July 1975) was an Indian politician. He was elected to the Lok Sabha, lower house of the Parliament of India from Murshidabad in West Bengal.

Bukhsh died on 24 July 1975, at the age of 62.

References

External links
Official biographical sketch in Parliament of India website

1913 births
1975 deaths
India MPs 1952–1957
India MPs 1957–1962
Lok Sabha members from West Bengal
Indian National Congress politicians from West Bengal